Columbia Falls is a town in Washington County, Maine, United States. The population was 476 at the 2020 census.

History

The town began as Township 13 SD, BPP, which was joined together with Township 12 by the Massachusetts General Court on February 8, 1796 and incorporated as Columbia. It was settled soon after the Revolutionary War. On March 25, 1863, the town was set off from Columbia and incorporated as Columbia Falls.

Lumbering and shipbuilding brought the town prosperity and endowed it with some fine early architecture. This includes the Ruggles House (1818–1820), an exquisite Federal home that is now a museum, and the Union Church (1849), a Greek Revival meeting house which since 1902 has housed the town hall, library and archives. The Washington County Railroad arrived at Columbia Falls in 1898. Tourism and harvesting blueberries are important industries today, together with producing Christmas trees and wreaths.

Geography

Columbia Falls is drained by the Pleasant River.

The town is crossed by U.S. Route 1 and Maine State Route 187.

Demographics

2010 census

As of the census of 2010, there were 560 people, 257 households, and 157 families living in the town. The racial makeup of the town was 97.5% White, 0.4% Native American, 0.7% Asian, 0.2% from other races, and 1.3% from two or more races. Hispanic or Latino of any race were 1.4% of the population.

There were 257 households, of which 23.7% had children under the age of 18 living with them, 48.2% were married couples living together, 8.2% had a female householder with no husband present, 4.7% had a male householder with no wife present, and 38.9% were non-families. 33.5% of all households were made up of individuals, and 15.2% had someone living alone who was 65 years of age or older. The average household size was 2.18 and the average family size was 2.71.

The median age in the town was 46 years. 18.7% of residents were under the age of 18; 6.5% were between the ages of 18 and 24; 23.4% were from 25 to 44; 32.5% were from 45 to 64; and 18.9% were 65 years of age or older. The gender makeup of the town was 49.5% male and 50.5% female.

2000 census

As of the census of 2000, there were 599 people, 251 households, and 168 families living in the town.  The population density was 24.4 people per square mile (9.4/km2).  There were 310 housing units at an average density of 12.6 per square mile (4.9/km2).  The racial makeup of the town was 97.83% White, 0.83% Native American, 0.33% Asian, 0.67% from other races, and 0.33% from two or more races. Hispanic or Latino of any race were 0.67% of the population.

There were 251 households, out of which 33.1% had children under the age of 18 living with them, 56.6% were married couples living together, 8.4% had a female householder with no husband present, and 32.7% were non-families. 28.3% of all households were made up of individuals, and 11.6% had someone living alone who was 65 years of age or older.  The average household size was 2.39 and the average family size was 2.90.

In the town, the population was spread out, with 24.2% under the age of 18, 6.7% from 18 to 24, 29.0% from 25 to 44, 26.0% from 45 to 64, and 14.0% who were 65 years of age or older.  The median age was 38 years. For every 100 females, there were 107.3 males.  For every 100 females age 18 and over, there were 102.7 males.

The median income for a household in the town was $28,864, and the median income for a family was $40,208. Males had a median income of $28,021 versus $19,625 for females. The per capita income for the town was $14,723.  About 12.9% of families and 19.0% of the population were below the poverty line, including 26.1% of those under age 18 and 29.1% of those age 65 or over.

Sites of interest

 Ruggles House
 Union Church, listed on the National Register of Historic Places
 Bucknam House, listed on the National Register of Historic Places
 Samuel Bucknam House, listed on the National Register of Historic Places
 Columbia House, listed on the National Register of Historic Places

Notable people 

 F. Eugene Farnsworth, Ku Klux Klan organizer
 Irv Young, professional baseball player

References

External links
 Maine.gov – Columbia Falls, Maine
 Downeast Salmon Federation

Towns in Washington County, Maine
Towns in Maine
1863 establishments in Maine